Letters Home is a collection of letters written by Sylvia Plath to her family between her years at college, in 1950, and her death at age 30. Sylvia's mother, Aurelia Schober Plath, edited the letters and the collection was published by Harper & Row (US) and Faber & Faber (UK) in 1975.

Letters Home contains an introduction by Aurelia Plath, who adds bits of commentary and context throughout. The book provides unique insight into Sylvia's mind, as her growth as a writer and as a woman is charted for more than a decade.

References

1975 non-fiction books
Collections of letters
Books by Sylvia Plath
Harper & Row books
Books published posthumously